Ty is an American multinational corporation and the owner of the Beanie Babies franchise.

TY or Ty may also refer to:

People
 Ty (given name)
 Zheng (surname), spelled Ty in the Philippines
 Ty (rapper) (1972–2020), Nigerian-British hip-hop artist
 George Ty (1932–2018), Chinese Filipino billionaire banker
 Ty Dolla Sign, stage name of American rapper Tyrone Griffin, Jr (born 1982)

Fictional characters
 Ty Rux, a T-Trux in the TV series Dinotrux
 The main character in the video game Ty the Tasmanian Tiger
 A character in the arcade game Pit Fighter
 Ty Lee, a recurring character in the television series Avatar: The Last Airbender
 Ty Webb, a character in the film Caddyshack
 Tiberius "Ty" Blackthorn, a character from the media franchise The Shadowhunter Chronicles

Other uses
 Ty (digraph)
 Tyr or Ty, a god in Norse mythology
 Tahitian language (ISO 639-1 code "ty")
 Transition Year, an academic year in secondary education in Ireland
 Camp Tel Yehudah, a Jewish summer camp in New York
 Air Calédonie (IATA airline code TY)

See also
 Ty Ty, Georgia, an American city
 Tyson (disambiguation)
 Tyler
 Tyrone (disambiguation)